The Return of the Gangsta is the sixth studio album by American rapper Coolio. It was released on October 16, 2006 via Hardwax Records. The single "Gangsta Walk" features Snoop Dogg on guest vocals. Most songs on this album were released again on Coolio's next album Steal Hear, which was released in 2008.

Track listing

Charts

References

External links 

2006 albums
Coolio albums